The Pensioner Settlements by-election 1858 was a by-election held in the multi-member  electorate during the 2nd New Zealand Parliament, on 29 April 1858.

The by-election was caused by the resignation of incumbent MP Joseph Greenwood and was won by Jermyn Symonds. On nomination day (28 April) Jermyn Symonds and Captain Balneavis were nominated, and after a show of hands in favour of Symonds, Balneavis demanded a poll. John Symonds was subsequently elected the following day.

Results

References

Pensioner Settlements 1858
1858 elections in New Zealand
April 1858 events
1850s in Auckland
Politics of the Auckland Region